QuickTime Streaming Server (QTSS) is a server or service daemon that was built into Apple's Mac OS X Server until OS X Server 10.6.8.  It delivers video and audio on request to users over a computer network, including the Internet. Its primary GUI configuration tool is QTSS Publisher and its web-based administration port is 1220. It also uses port UDP/7100. When used in conjunction with QuickTime Broadcaster, it is possible to deliver live real-time video and audio to multiple users over networks.

The protocol used has since been superseded with HTTP Live Streaming used in iOS and Mac OS.

See also 
Darwin Streaming Server
Helix Universal Server
HTTP Live Streaming
Wowza Media Server

References

External links 
 

Streaming Server
MacOS-only software made by Apple Inc.
Streaming software
MacOS Server